Appearances and goals are for first-team competitive matches only. Wartime matches are regarded as unofficial and are excluded, as are matches from the abandoned 1939–40 season.

References

Players
 
Rochdale
Association football player non-biographical articles